THM, Thm, thm or ThM may refer to:

Turbo-Hydramatic, GM vehicle transmission
Ton of heavy metal in a nuclear power plant
Ton of hot metal in the steel industry
Trihalomethanes in chemistry
Therm, a unit of heat energy
 Technische Hochschule Mittelhessen—University of Applied Sciences
Master of Theology postnominal, ThM